Terminalia platyptera is a tree of the family Combretaceae native to northern Australia.

It blooms in October producing white-cream flowers.

It is in the Kimberley region of Western Australia growing in sandy soils.

References

platyptera
Trees of Australia
Flora of the Northern Territory
Rosids of Western Australia
Plants described in 1861
Taxa named by Ferdinand von Mueller